Samuel Le Bihan (born 2 November 1965) is a French actor, known for his role in Brotherhood of the Wolf.

Selected filmography

Film
 1993: , directed by René Féret
 1993: , directed by René Féret
 1993:  (Three Colours: Red), directed by Krzysztof Kieślowski
 1994: , directed by Régis Wargnier
 1996: , directed by Bertrand Tavernier
 1997: , directed by Alain Corneau
 1997: , directed by Laetitia Masson
 1997: , directed by Jean-Paul Salomé
 1998: , directed by Fernando Colomo
 1998:  (Venus Beauty Institute), directed by Tonie Marshall
 1999: , directed by Émilie Deleuze
 1999: , directed by Éric Rochant
 2000: Jet Set, directed by Fabien Onteniente
 2001:  (Brotherhood of the Wolf), directed by Christophe Gans
 2001:  (He Loves Me... He Loves Me Not), directed by 
 2001: , directed by Fabien Onteniente
 2001: The Code, directed by 
 2002: A Private Affair, directed by Guillaume Nicloux
 2002: , directed by Karim Dridi
 2003: , directed by Laurent Baffie
 2004: , directed by Dominique Dureddere
 2004: The bridge of San Luis Rey, directed by Mary Mac Guckian
 2005: The Last Sign, directed by Douglas Law
 2006: , directed by 
 2006: Cars, Studio Pixar / Disney
 2006:  (Frontier(s)), directed by Xavier Gens
 2006: , directed by Jose-Manuel Gonzalez
 2008: Disco, directed by Fabien Onteniente
 2008: , directed by 
 2008: , directed by Jean-François Richet
 2011: , directed by Anne Le Ny
 2014: , directed by

Television
 1988: La Chaîne, directed by Claude Faraldo
 1988: Tempête sur la manche directed by Edouard Logereau
 1993: L'Homme du banc, directed by Etienne Périer
 1997: L'Amour à vif, directed by Jean-Pierre Ameris
 2004: 93, Rue Lauriston, directed by Denys Granier-Deferre

Theatre
 1993	La mégère apprivoisée, Mise en scène : Jérôme Savary de William Shakespeare
 1999	Un tramway nommé Désir,	Mise en scène: Philippe Adriende Tennessee Williams
 2005	Brooklyn boy, Mise en scène : Michel Fagadau de Donald Margulies
 2009  Paroles et Guerison, Mise en scene: Didier Long
 2011  Hollywood, Mise en scene: Daniel Colas

Music videos
 2004: "Qui suis-je?" Kool Shen (actor: Jo Prestia) Directed by J.G Biggs .

Additional activities
Samuel was the main sponsor of the French charity organization called "November in Childhood." He is also a supporter of the international humanitarian organization Action Against Hunger.

References
 Source : biographie officielle (frelon productions)

External links

 
 Site officiel de l'opération Novembre En Enfance
 Site officiel de Frelon productions
 Site officiel de Samuel Le Bihan

1965 births
Living people
French male film actors
People from Manche
Troupe of the Comédie-Française
French people of Breton descent
French male stage actors
French male television actors
French National Academy of Dramatic Arts alumni
Cours Florent alumni
20th-century French male actors
21st-century French male actors